is a 2006 Japanese romance film directed by Nobuhiro Doi. Starring Masami Nagasawa, Satoshi Tsumabuki, Kumiko Aso as Kaoru Aragaki, Yotaro Aragaki and Keiko Inamine, the film depicts Okinawan step-siblings, Kaoru and Yotaru, growing up.

Cast
 Satoshi Tsumabuki - Yotaro Aragaki
 Masami Nagasawa - Kaoru Aragaki
 Kumiko Aso - Keiko Inamine
 Takashi Tsukamoto - Yuichi Shimabukuro
 Tomi Taira - Mito Niigaki (grandmother)
 Eiichiro Funakoshi - Kameoka
 Isao Hashizume - Keiko's father

Reception
Nada Sōsō was nominated for Best Actor (Satoshi Tsumabuki) and Best Actress (Masami Nagasawa) for the 2007 Japanese Academy Awards. However, for the 2007 Bunshun Kiichigo Awards, Nada Sōsō was ranked 4th worst film and Masami Nagasawa as worst actress.

The Japan Times Mark Schilling comments that the film "has the feel of a more hardscrabble, pure-spirited time and place, when struggle, sacrifice and premature death for the virtuous on-screen heroes were as common as chopsticks." Film critic Victor Chan commends the film, saying, "Nada Sou Sou boasts of all-round great acting by its cast, and its simple but homely style neatly complements the strong rural Okinawan setting, making this movie a classic triple hanky tearjerker which should appeal to not just the young Japanese movie fan, but also older audiences who have been starved for good tearjerkers." Calvin McMillin, reviewing for LoveHKFilm, criticises the relationship between Tsumabuki and Nagasawa, saying they "do a serviceable job as would-be lovers, but both performances are somewhat problematic in execution. Although likeable enough, Tsumabuki doesn't seem to be able to handle the emotional scenes, as it always looks as if he's going to laugh even when he's breaking down in tears." He criticises Nagasawa's acting by stating "[she] is so over-exuberant (perhaps intentionally so) in the initial parts of the film that she's more of a grating presence than an endearing one. However, Nagasawa's performance improves considerably as the more dramatic aspects of the plot kick into overdrive." He also underlines the film's main downfall in trying to "adhere to the "Pure Love" aesthetic [that] the filmmakers completely gloss over the complications that could arise from a blossoming romantic relationship between these step-siblings by purposely avoiding the issue at any cost."

References

External links

German review

2006 films
2000s Japanese-language films
2000s romance films
Japanese romance films
Films directed by Nobuhiro Doi
Films set in Okinawa Prefecture
Films shot in Okinawa Prefecture
Films about siblings
2000s Japanese films